Tom O'Toole may refer to:
 Tom O'Toole (businessman) (born 1952), Australian inspirational speaker, author and businessman
 Tom O'Toole (Boston College basketball), American basketball player at Boston College
 Tom O'Toole (basketball, born 1913) (1913–1983), American basketball player in the National Basketball League
 Tom O'Toole (rugby union) (born 1998), Irish rugby union player

See also
 Thomas O'Toole (1931–2003), science reporter and editor